Gez-e Gerd may refer to:
 Gez-e Gerd, Kuh Panj
 Gez-e Gerd, Mashiz